Nad is an English language transliteration of the East Slavic spelling "Надь" of the Hungarian surname Nagy. Notable people with this surname include:

Oleksandr Nad, Ukrainian footballer of Hungarian ethnicity

Belarusian-language surnames
Russian-language surnames
Ukrainian-language surnames